Moutiers-en-Puisaye (literally Moutiers in Puisaye) is a commune in the Yonne department in Bourgogne-Franche-Comté in north-central France, in the historical region of Puisaye. The parish church is dedicated to Saints Peter and Paul.

See also
Communes of the Yonne department

References

Communes of Yonne